Guihomar VI of Léon (bef. 1200–c. 1239) was a Viscount of Léon, son of Conan I.

Life 
Guihomar VI may have taken part to the Battle of Bouvines in 1214 and in 1222 he rebelled against Peter Mauclerc, Alix of Thouars's husband, with several other Breton lords. In 1231 he did homage to the French King Louis IX for all his lands, out of defiance towards Peter, who was supported by the English King Henry III.

However, in 1237, he paid homage to the new Duke John I the Red, Peter and Alix's eldest son, but soon entered into conflict with him as well.

Guihomar VI died around 1239.

Issue 
Guihomar may have married Marie of Penthievre. They had a son:
 Harvey III, who succeeded his father

References

Sources 
 Patrick Kernévez, André-Yves Bourgès Généalogie des vicomtes de Léon (XIe, XIIe et XIIIe siècles). Bulletin de la Société archéologique du Finistère, volume CXXXVI, 2007, p. 157-188.

Viscounts of Léon
House of Léon